A vehicle category classifies a land vehicle or trailer for regulatory purposes.

UNECE categories 
United Nations Economic Commission for Europe Information from Consolidated Resolution on the Construction of Vehicles (R.E.3), Revision 6.

Some categories have further sub classes. See Consolidated Resolution on the Construction of Vehicles (R.E.3) for further information.

Vehicles in the table listed within parentheses are examples of the vehicle in that category, e.g. (Bus).

Category notes

EU classification 

In the European Union, the classifications for vehicle category are based on UNECE standards and defined by:
 Regulation (EU) No 168/2013 of the European Parliament and of the Council of 15 January 2013 on the approval and market surveillance of two- or three-wheel vehicles and quadricycles.
 Directive 2007/46/EC of the European Parliament and of the Council of 5 September 2007 establishing a framework for the approval of motor vehicles and their trailers, and of systems, components and separate technical units intended for such vehicles.

The EU general classification of vehicle categories is:
 Two- or three-wheel vehicles and quadricycles:
 Category L1e: light two-wheel powered vehicle
 Category L1e-A: powered cycle
 Category L1e-B: two-wheel moped
 Category L2e: three-wheel moped
 Category L2e-P: three-wheel moped designed for passenger transport
 Category L2e-U: three wheel moped designed for utility purposes
 Category L3e: two-wheel motorcycle
 sub-categorized by performance:
 Category L3e-A1: low-performance motorcycle
 Category L3e-A2: medium-performance motorcycle
 Category L3e-A3: high-performance motorcycle
 sub-categorized by special use:
 Category L3e-A1E, L3e-A2E or L3e-A3E: enduro motorcycle
 Category L3e-A1T, L3e-A2T or L3e-A3T: trial motorcycle
 Category L4e: two-wheel motorcycle with side-car
 Category L5e: powered tricycle
 Category L5e-A: tricycle (mainly designed for passenger transport)
 Category L5e-B: commercial tricycle (utility tricycle exclusively designed for the carriage of goods)
 Category L6e: light quadricycle
 Category L6e-A: light on-road quad
 Category L6e-B: light quadri-mobile
 Category L6e-BU: light quadri-mobile for utility purposes (utility vehicle exclusively designed for the carriage of goods)
 Category L6e-BP: light quadri-mobile for passenger transport (vehicle mainly designed for passenger transport)
 Category L7e: heavy quadricycles
 Category L7e-A: heavy on-road quad
 Category L7e-A1: A1 on-road quad
 Category L7e-A2: A2 on-road quad
 Category L7e-B: heavy all terrain quad
 Category L7e-B1: all terrain quad
 Category L7e-B2: side-by-side buggy
 Category L7e-C: heavy quadri-mobile
 Category L7e-CU: heavy quadri-mobile for utility purposes (utility vehicle exclusively designed for the carriage of goods)
 Category L7e-CP: heavy quadri-mobile for passenger transport (vehicle mainly designed for passenger transport)
Motor vehicles with at least four wheels:
 Category M: used for the carriage of passengers
Category M1: no more than eight seats in addition to the driver seat (mainly, cars)
more than eight seats in addition to the driver seat (buses):
Category M2: having a maximum mass not exceeding 
Category M3: having a maximum mass exceeding 5 tonnes
Category N: used for the carriage of goods (trucks):
Category N1: having a maximum mass not exceeding 
Category N2: having a maximum mass exceeding 3.5 tonnes but not exceeding 
Category N3: having a maximum mass exceeding 12 tonnes
Category O: trailers (including semi-trailers)
Category O1: maximum mass not exceeding 
Category O2: exceeding 0.75 tonnes but not exceeding 
Category O3: exceeding 3.5 tonnes but not exceeding 
Category O4: exceeding 10 tonnes
Symbol G: off-road vehicles
Special purpose vehicles

European driving licenses 
There is also a different category classification for driver licensing purposes.

The table below shows a translation of Vehicle Categories to European Driving Licence Categories, indicating which vehicle class can be driven with which category of licence.

National classification of EU countries

Czech Republic 
In the Czech Republic, land vehicle categories are defined by the act No. 56/2001 Sb. and the ordinance No. 341/2002 Sb. Categories M (including M1, M2, M3), N (including N1, N2, N3), of-road symbol G of M and N vehicles (M1G, M2G, M3G, N1G, N2G, N3G) and the category O (including O1, O2, O3 and O4) are defined according to the EU directive. Moreover, there are defined categories:
 Category L: light motor vehicles
 Category LM: bicycles with auxiliary motor (volume of cylinder not exceeding 50 ccm, design speed not exceeding 25 km/h)
 Category LA: two-wheeled mopeds (generally, volume of cylinder not exceeding 50 ccm, design speed not exceeding 45 km/h)
 Category LB: three-wheeled mopeds and light four-wheelers (generally, volume of cylinder not exceeding 50 ccm or motor power not exceeding 4 kW, design speed not exceeding 45 km/h, mass of empty vehicle not exceeding 350 kg)
 Category LC: motorcycles (two-wheeled, with one or more parameters exceeding the LA category)
 Category LD: motorcycles with sidecars (with one or more parameters exceeding the LB category)
 Category LE: tricars and four-wheelers (with one or more parameters exceeding the LB category), four-wheelers of mass not exceeding 400 kg (or 550 kg in case of freight vehicle) motor power of four-wheeler not exceeding 15 kW
 Category T: forestry and agricultural tractors
 Category T1: standard tractors (a gauge exceeding 1150 mm, mass of empty vehicle exceeding 600 kg, ride height not exceeding 1000 mm
 Category T2: mass of empty vehicle exceeding 600 kg, a gauge less than 1150 mm, ride height less than 600 mm
 Category T3: vehicle mass less than 600 kg
 Category T4.1: ride height more than 1000 mm
 Category T4.2: extra wide tractors
 Category OT1: tractor trailer, maximum mass not exceeding 1.5 tonnes
 Category OT2: tractor trailer, maximum mass exceeding 1.5 tonnes but not exceeding 3.5 tonnes
 Category OT3: tractor trailer, maximum mass exceeding 3.5 tonnes but not exceeding 6 tonnes
 Category OT4: tractor trailer, maximum mass exceeding 6 tonnes
 Category S: movable industrial machines
 Category SS: self-propelled industrial machines
 Category SP: trailer industrial machines (SP1 up to 3 tonnes, SP2 up to 6 tonnes, SP3 over 6 tonnes)
 Category SPT: tractor trailer industrial machines (SPT1, SPT2...)
 Category R: other vehicles (contains human-powered and animal-powered vehicles like bicycles and carts, wheelchairs, motor vehicles without carriage body, caterpillar vehicles, one-axle tractors etc.)

See also 
 Bus
 Car classification
 European emission standards
 Motorised quadricycle
 Truck classification
 Type approval
 UNECE
 Vehicle acronyms and abbreviations
 Vehicle regulation

References

External links 
 , U.S. Federal Motor Vehicle Safety Standards, Definitions

Vehicle law
Land vehicles
Vehicles by type